Harry E. Trotsek (April 18, 1912 – February 5, 1997) was an American Hall of Fame trainer and owner of Thoroughbred racehorses. He trained 96 stakes race winners including Champions Hasty Road, Moccasin, Oil Capitol, and Stan, and led all North American trainers in purse winnings in 1953.

Trotsek was widely respected for his development of young jockeys including such riders as Johnny Sellers, Kenny Church and John Rotz.

Retirement
After fifty-seven years as a trainer, Trotsek retired in 1988. He and his wife Cora Mae Hill Trotsek were living in Coral Gables, Florida, at the time of his death in 1997.

Quotes
Known as a very patient trainer who got the most out of horses under his care, Trotsek is noted for an interview in which he said that "Good horses, overcome all sorts of things—including their trainers."

References

1912 births
1997 deaths
American horse trainers
United States Thoroughbred Racing Hall of Fame inductees
People from Cicero, Illinois